Christopher Everton Junior Thompson (born 26 June 1987 in Lambeth) is an English cricketer active from 2005 who has played for Leicestershire. He appeared in one first-class match in 2009 as a righthanded batsman who bowls right arm fast medium. He scored 16 runs with a highest score of 16 and took one wickets with a best performance of one for 45.

Notes

1987 births
English cricketers
Leicestershire cricketers
Cambridgeshire cricketers
Living people
People from Lambeth
English cricketers of the 21st century